Cecily G. and the Nine Monkeys is a 1939 children's short story written and illustrated by German-American author H. A. Rey. It is the first story to feature Rey's now-famous character, Curious George. When it was first published in France, Cecily's original name was Rafi; Raffy when it was first published in the United Kingdom. But when it appeared in the United States, the character was renamed Cecily.

Synopsis
The story follows the exploits of Cecily Giraffe, or simply "Cecily G." for short. She is saddened by the loss of her fellow jungle animals and family, all of whom had been captured and placed in a zoo.

In another section of the jungle lived a female monkey named Mother Pamplemoose. She and her eight offspring were left homeless by the loss of all the trees in their forest due to woodcutters.  It is here the character of Curious George is introduced, who declares that it is time for the family to pack their belongings and move on.

Eventually, the monkeys can go no further due to a deep ravine. It is baby Jinny, the youngest monkey, who notices the dejected Cecily G. on the other side of the ravine.  Cecily G. notices the monkeys as well, immediately stops crying and asks the monkeys if they would like to cross. To assist them in crossing, Cecily G. leaps forward across the divide, bridging it with her body.

Curious George is the first monkey to cross and introduces the family to their rescuer. When each learns of the other's plight, Cecily invites the monkeys to stay and live with her.

The climax occurs when a fire breaks out in the upper floors of Cecily's tall, giraffe-shaped house. The monkeys work as a team with Cecily; two of the strongest monkeys work an emergency water pump while the remaining six guide the hose to the top of Cecily's neck, using her height to reach the fire.

That incident cements the bond of friendship, so much so that James, one of the young monkeys, composes a song in Cecily's honor. The final page of the book features the lyrics and musical notation of the song with the monkeys serving as notes and Cecily as the treble clef.

Publishing history

The first edition was published by Gallimard in Paris in 1939. Three years later, an English version was published by Chatto & Windus in London.

The story's most recent English printing was in 2007 by Houghton Mifflin Harcourt.

References

1939 short stories
French children's books
Curious George
Fictional giraffes
Éditions Gallimard books
1939 children's books